USS McDermut (DD-262) was a  in service with the United States Navy from 1919 to 1929. She was scrapped in 1932.

Description
The Clemson class was a repeat of the preceding  although more fuel capacity was added. They had a crew of 6 officers and 108 enlisted men.

Performance differed radically between the ships of the class, often due to poor workmanship. The Clemson class was powered by two steam turbines, each driving one propeller shaft, using steam provided by four water-tube boilers.

The ships were armed with four 4-inch (102 mm) guns in single mounts and were fitted with two  1-pounder guns for anti-aircraft defense. In many ships a shortage of 1-pounders caused them to be replaced by 3-inch (76 mm) guns. Their primary weapon, though, was their torpedo battery of a dozen 21 inch (533 mm) torpedo tubes in four triple mounts. They also carried a pair of depth charge rails. A "Y-gun" depth charge thrower was added to many ships.

Construction and career
McDermut, named for David McDermut was laid down 20 April 1918 by Bethlehem Shipbuilding Corporation, Squantum, Massachusetts; launched 6 August 1918; sponsored by Mrs. Eugene G. Grace; and commissioned 27 March 1919. Assigned to the Atlantic Fleet, McDermut departed Boston, Massachusetts 28 May for Brest, France. She returned to the east coast 24 July only to sail for the west coast in the fall, arriving at San Diego, California the day before Christmas. During the next 8 and a half years, with few exceptions, she operated in the eastern Pacific, steaming along the coast from Panama to Canada, and among the Hawaiian Islands. In 1924, she had a small part in the silent film The Navigator, starring Buster Keaton and Kathryn McGuire.

In 1924 and 1927 she transited the Panama Canal for abbreviated duties in the Caribbean and Gulf of Mexico and in 1925 took part in a good will visit to Samoa, Australia, and New Zealand. On 22 March 1927 McDermut, returning from a cruise to Panama, arrived at the San Diego Destroyer Base, where she decommissioned 22 May 1929. Struck from the Naval Register 11 November 1931, she was scrapped and sold, 25 February 1932, in accordance with the terms of the London Treaty for Naval Disarmament.

Notes

References

External links

http://www.navsource.org/archives/05/262.htm
Mare Island Navy Yard  - 1928. Elbridge Ayer Burbank pencil sketch.

 

Clemson-class destroyers
Ships built in Quincy, Massachusetts
1918 ships